(alternative name 清水橋駅 Shimizubashi Station) is a train station on the Toei Oedo Line. It is operated by the Tokyo Metropolitan Bureau of Transportation.

Surrounding area
Nishi-Shinjuku Gochome is a residential area west of Shinjuku.  This station is at the heart of Nishi-Shinjuku's residential high rise area.  Shinjuku Central park is a short walk east of the station.  The Toho educational group has many schools within walking distance of the station. Nishi-Shinjuku Gochome also has a small commercial center.

Station layout
Like most stations on the Oedo line, this station has an island platform serving two tracks.

History
The station opened on 19 December 1997.

Ridership
As of 2018, the station saw a daily patronage of 36,090 passengers.

Surrounding area
Graduate School of Film Producing
Shibuya honmachi gakuen Elementary School and Junior High School
Ito En
Toei Bus Shibuya Depot, Shinjuku Branch Office
Kanto International Senior High School
Tokyu Stay Nishi-Shinjuku hotel

Buses
Nishi-Shinjuku Gochome is served by the Keio Dentetsu Bus Company.  Two bus lines pass through this station.  All eastbound buses are bound for Shinjuku.  Westbound, the 33 bus heads to Eifukucho and the 32 heads in a similar direction.  West of the station at the Shimizubashi intersection, the 64 Keio bus heads North to Nakano Sakaue Station and Nakano Station while the southbound buses head to Shibuya Station.

References
This article incorporates information from the corresponding article on the Japanese Wikipedia.

Railway stations in Japan opened in 1997
Railway stations in Tokyo